Ultimate Live Lounge was a competition run by Radio 1 in 2009 to find the best Live Lounge performance to date. Over the previous 10 years there had been more than 500 Live Lounge sessions with hundreds of artists performing their single and an exclusive cover on air. After a series of heats, three semi-finals, and a weekend-long Grand Final, BBC Radio 1 listeners chose their Ultimate Live Lounge Cover, "Stronger" by Thirty Seconds to Mars.

References

Live Lounge